British Airways serves destinations across all six inhabited continents. Following is a list of destinations the airline flies to, ; terminated destinations are also listed. The list does not include cities served solely by affiliated regional carriers, and some terminated destinations may now be served either via franchise or through codeshare agreements with other carriers.

List

See also

 British Airways franchise destinations
 British Airways World Cargo
 Transport in the United Kingdom

Notes and references

Notes

References

External links 
 British Airways' current destination list

Destinations
Lists of airline destinations
Oneworld destinations
United Kingdom aviation-related lists